St. Albert Catholic High School (SACHS) is a high school in St. Albert, Alberta, Canada and is part of Greater St. Albert Catholic Regional Division No. 29. The school colours are yellow and blue.

Notable alumni
Paul Chalifoux - Former Mayor of St. Albert
Nick Holden - professional ice hockey player

References
http://www.stalbertgazette.com/article/Crazy-Grey-Cup-for-Doll-20161130

External links
St. Albert Catholic High School

Educational institutions established in 1967
High schools in Alberta
International Baccalaureate schools in Alberta
Catholic secondary schools in Alberta
Schools in St. Albert, Alberta
1967 establishments in Alberta